Scaphinotus debilis is a species of ground beetle in the family Carabidae. It is found in North America.

Subspecies
These two subspecies belong to the species Scaphinotus debilis:
 Scaphinotus debilis alpinus (Beutenmüller, 1903)
 Scaphinotus debilis debilis (LeConte, 1853)

References

Further reading

 

Carabinae
Articles created by Qbugbot
Beetles described in 1853